Edward "Ned" Lyons was a New York City gangster in the 19th century. Born in Ireland July 15, 1839, he immigrated to America as a child and settled in Lowell, Massachusetts. A burglar and bank robber, he learned his criminal trade in New York City. He was sentenced to Sing Sing Prison, from which he escaped in 1872 with his wife, Sophie Lyons. After serving multiple prison terms he became a notorious hustler and conman.

Ned learned to understand how people think and react, and although impaired by extreme near-sightedness, he was capable of quickly identifying liars, earning himself a high powered position among the gangs of New York.  Physically, he had a strikingly large head.

References

Further reading
Asbury, Henry. The French Quarter: An Informal History of the New Orleans Underworld. New York: Alfred A. Knoff, 1936. 
Davidson, Shayne. Queen of the Burglars: The Scandalous Life of Sophie Lyons. Jefferson, N.C.: Exposit Books, 2020.

External links
 The Willimantic Chronicle - Year of 1884, imprisoned at Springfield
 Edward Lyons, alias Ned Lyons, Professional Criminals of America by Byrnes

Gang members of New York City
Escapees from New York (state) detention
Criminals from New York City
1839 births
1906 deaths